State v. Henry was a 1987 decision of the Oregon Supreme Court which held that the Oregon state law that criminalized obscenity was unconstitutional because it violated the free speech provision of the Oregon Constitution. The ruling made Oregon the first (and only state as of 2022) to abolish the offense of obscenity in its state law, although obscenity remains a federal offense.

Background
The case came about when the owner of an adult bookstore, Earl Henry, was charged and convicted of obscenity (specifically for possessing and distributing obscene materials) after police raided his store. He was fined $2,000 and sentenced to 60 days in jail but was allowed to remain free pending an appeal. The ACLU of Oregon filed an appeal to the Oregon Supreme Court on Mr. Henry's behalf arguing that the Oregon Constitution's free speech clause (Article 1, Section 8) provides greater protection than the free speech clause found in the First Amendment to the United States Constitution and that "state courts should interpret and develop state law under their state constitutions without regard to the swings in interpretation at the national level", especially when state constitutions provide greater protections than the federal one.

Ruling
In a unanimous (7-0) ruling on January 21, 1987, the Oregon Supreme Court agreed that "the text of the state constitution was "broader" than the text of the First Amendment and dismissed the charges against Earl Henry. The court's ruling declared that the state's obscenity statute was unconstitutional with the majority opinion noting that:

The court further explained that "no criminal law could outlaw a certain category of speech unless that speech represented a "historically established exception" to the general guarantee of freedom of expression afforded by the state constitution", noting that "The very fact that 'obscenity' originally was pursued and repressed for its 'anti-establishment' irreverence rather than for its bawdiness elsewhere and only to protect the morals of youth in this state leads us to conclude that no broad or all-encompassing historical exception from the guarantees of free expression was ever intended."

Aftermath
Oregon Ballot Measure 19 (1994) and Oregon Ballot Measure 31 (1995) attempted to amend the free speech provision of the Oregon Constitution so that it no longer protected obscenity but both measures failed and no other changes have been proposed since.

References

Further reading
Long, William R. "Free Speech in Oregon." Oregon State Bar Bulletin. October 2003.
ACLU of Oregon. "Oregon's Unique Constitutional Protection of Free Expression is Challenged."ACLU of Oregon. September 2005

Obscenity law
United States Free Speech Clause case law
Oregon state case law
1987 in United States case law
1987 in Oregon